Karl Pannos (16 September 1908 – 17 September 1944) was an Austrian gymnast. He competed in eight events at the 1936 Summer Olympics. He was killed during World War II.

References

1908 births
1944 deaths
Austrian male artistic gymnasts
Olympic gymnasts of Austria
Gymnasts at the 1936 Summer Olympics
Sportspeople from Vienna
Austrian military personnel killed in World War II
Missing in action of World War II
20th-century Austrian people